Steve Connor (born October 5, 1961) is an author, speaker, leadership coach, and former NFL football player. He is the founder of Sports Outreach International, and has worked with athletes and sports organizations on every continent except Antarctica. His books have been distributed worldwide.

Sports Outreach International
Founded by Steve Connor in 1996, Sports Outreach International is devoted to developing leadership and fraternity through the avenues of sports and competition. They work with youth and sports organizations in countries across the globe. Sports Outreach International is associated with several different sports ministry organizations, including Intersports, Fellowship of Christian Athletes, Athletes in Action and Christians in Sport. While living in England and Scotland (1990–2004) Connor helped pioneer youth sports ministries helping establish Christian sports camps (SportsPlus) in England, Scotland, Wales and Ireland.

Connor has given lectures at many institutions, including Oxford University, Sandhurst Military Academy, Eton College and Joe Gibbs Racing.

Connor has published eleven books, including A Sporting Guide to Eternity (2004), which reached Thomas Wesley best-seller status and was short-listed for “Harvest” Christian book of the year in 2004. Connor designed a copyright free Coaching Character Curriculum that has been adapted for use in Africa, as well as by coaches, youth workers and organizations in Europe, Asia, Australia, North America, and South America.

Career in American Football
Connor attended Wheaton North High School in northern Illinois, where he was a prominent football player. He first attended Northern Illinois University, as a Division 1 scholarship athlete in football. From there, he transferred to Azusa Pacific University, where he was twice named an All-American player (1982 and 1983) and was inducted into APU's Hall of Fame in 2008. After college, Steve was a free agent for the 1984 Chicago Bears, ending his season on the injured reserve list. In the 1985 season, he was picked up by the L.A. Rams as a free agent, where he suffered a career-ending knee injury.

Coaching and Sports Leadership
After his time as a player, Connor moved on to coach football and work in sports ministry and sports leadership. He first coached at Western Washington University (1986). Later he became the Southern Indiana Area Director for the Fellowship of Christian Athletes. He was Chaplain of Indiana University's varsity football team from 1987-1989 under Coach Bill Mallory, whom Connor had first met when Mallory coached at Northern Illinois University. Connor then coached the Oxford Saints American Football Club in England from 1990-1995. He was also Assistant Head Coach for the United States Air Force team at RAF Upper Heyford. In 1992-93, He has had various roles in chaplaincy to players in the Scottish Premier League and England's Premier League. He was Chaplain for the NFL Europe Scottish Claymores from 1999–2004. He returned as Chaplain for Indiana University's varsity football team under Coach Kevin Wilson. He  facilitated the network of sports ministries in North America 2006-2015 and teaches leadership globally, establishing ministry organizations on every continent.

Personal life
Connor lives with his wife in Rockaway Beach Missouri.

Awards and honors
Letter Winner (Football), Northern Illinois University, 1979–1980
All-American (Football), Asuza Pacific University, 1982–83
Centennial Award 1999, Azusa Pacific University
Hall of Fame, Asuza Pacific University, 2006
Oxford Saints Hall of Fame, 2008
L.H.D. Litterarum Humanarum Doctorate from Azusa Pacific University, 2009

Books
Sports Plus, 1996
Sports Outreach Scotland (Magazine), 1999–2004
Sports Outreach, 2003
TEAMS Study Series, 2003
Leadership Teams
Impact Teams
Discovery Teams
A Sporting Guide to Eternity, 2004
NT: Sport (Europe), 2004
NT: Sport (USA), 2004
Power: NT (South Pacific), 2005
. Rugged Discipleship, 2020

Notes

References 
 Denny, Dan, "Outreach program uses sports to open doors", Herald-Times, 22 Sept. 2008.
 Pine, Gary, "The Hall Calls Eight", Asuza Pacific News and Events, 15 Oct 2007.
 Simpson, Bill. "One Testimony of Sports Outreach International", Lausanne World Pulse, July 2006.

External links
 Sports Outreach International website

1961 births
Living people
American football defensive tackles
Northern Illinois Huskies football players
Azusa Pacific Cougars football players
Chicago Bears players
Los Angeles Rams players
Players of American football from Illinois
People from Wheaton, Illinois